Love of a Lifetime may refer to:
Love of a Lifetime, a 1988 album by Edgar Meyer
Love of a Lifetime, a 1998 album by Oteil and the Peacemakers
"Love of a Lifetime" (FireHouse song), 1991
"Love of a Lifetime" (Larry Gatlin song), 1988
"Love of a Lifetime" (Honeyz song), 1999
"Love of a Lifetime" (Chaka Khan song), 1986